Giovanni Rossi (7 May 1926 – 17 September 1983) was a Swiss professional road bicycle racer. He was professional from 1949 to 1954 where he won two victories. In the only Tour de France that he participated, Rossi won the first stage and wore the yellow jersey as leader of the general classification for one stage after his win. His other victory was a stage win in the Tour de Suisse, also in 1951. He also finished second in another stage in that year’s Tour de France and came second in the 1951 Swiss road race championships behind 1950 Tour de France winner Ferdinand "Ferdi" Kübler.

He also competed in the individual and team road race events at the 1948 Summer Olympics.

Major results

1951
Circuit de la Côte d'Or
Tour de France:
Winner stage 1
Wearing yellow jersey for one day
Tour de Suisse: one stage

References

External links

1926 births
1983 deaths
Swiss male cyclists
Swiss Tour de France stage winners
Sportspeople from Pyrénées-Atlantiques
Tour de Suisse stage winners
Olympic cyclists of Switzerland
Cyclists at the 1948 Summer Olympics
People from Labourd
Cyclists from Nouvelle-Aquitaine